Mordellistena parcestrigosa is a species of beetle in the genus Mordellistena of the family Mordellidae. It was described by Franciscolo in 1994.

References

Beetles described in 1994
parcestrigosa